Tamanak-e Sofla (also Romanized as Tamānak-e Soflá; also known as Tūmanak-e Pā’īn, Tūmānak-e Soflá, and Tūmanak-e Soflá) is a village in Sepidar Rural District, in the Central District of Boyer-Ahmad County, Kohgiluyeh and Boyer-Ahmad Province, Iran. At the 2006 census, its population was 48, in 8 families.

References 

Populated places in Boyer-Ahmad County